Bharathan Effect is a 2007 Indian Malayalam-language science fiction film written by Madhu Muttam, directed by Anil Das and starring Biju Menon in the title role. The film is about a genius inventor who makes a small gadget which can fly without fuel using the concept of antigravity.

Plot

Bharathan is a post-graduate and unemployed. Somehow he manages to get the job of a Malayalam teacher at a tuition centre. His wife Geetha works in a consumer store. The couple stays in a rented house owned by Kariyachan. Bharathan is a genius inventor and has a rather inquisitive mind especially as far as scientific matters are concerned. He is always around inventions with little care on what happens around him. He never sticks to any particular job, which lands his family in deep financial troubles.

His wife Geetha is upset about all this, but there is little she can do to keep her husband from becoming the laughing stock of many who don't understand him. Some people like Kariachan cleverly usurp the patent rights of some of Bharathan's crude inventions. The few people who come with helping hands are Thankachan, one of his students in the tuition centre, and Peter, who goes around finding him new jobs. In the meantime, Bharathan invents a gadget that could be used to clean and sweep the courtyard and also to pluck coconuts and fruits from palms and trees.

One day, on the way to take classes, Bharathan notices a paper rocket-flown by some children-staying midair for an unusually long period of time. This and a few other experiences lead him to a very spectacular discovery relating to gravity. But people around him brand him a lunatic and that leads to many problems in his life. But Bharathan does discover the reason behind the phenomenon is antigravity and claims that he can make flying objects that can be used by man to reach any destination without any fuel, and he suddenly gets famous. But due to over concentration, Bharathan loses his memory about the project. The government brings a psychiatrist to cure him. He finds that with some seemingly fatal interventions, Bharathan could be cured and he could make antigravity workable.

Cast
 Biju Menon as Bharathan
 Geethu Mohandas as Geetha
 Jayakrishnan as Thankachan
 Jagathy Sreekumar as Kariyachan
 Ponnamma Babu as Alice, Kariyachan's wife
 Sudheesh as Peter
 Ajith S. Nair as Koshi Kunju (Businessman & Karia's relative)
 Innocent as George,Thankachan's father
 Kalpana as Nancy, Thankachan's mother
 Rajan P. Dev as Fr. Stephen
 Suresh Gopi as Dr. Pandala, the psychiatrist (Special appearance)

Reception
A critic from Indiaglitz.com said that the film "has not eyed anything exceptional other than the central plot, and would have worked better if it was promoted as a children's film!" Paresh C Palicha of Rediff.com concluded his review saying, "In all, Anil Das's Bharathan Effect would have worked wonders if it was made 20 years ago, and promoted as a children's film!" The film received a few positive reviews as well. G. Jayakumar of The Hindu appreciated the film "for the treatment of an unusual theme." He also praised the technical aspects and the cast performances.

See also
 Science fiction film of India

References

External links
 

2007 films
2000s Malayalam-language films
Indian science fiction thriller films
2007 science fiction films
Indian science fiction films
Films scored by Ouseppachan